The following lists events that happened during 1940 in the Union of Soviet Socialist Republics.

Incumbents
 General Secretary of the Communist Party of the Soviet Union – Joseph Stalin
 Chairman of the Presidium of the Supreme Soviet of the Soviet Union – Mikhail Kalinin
 Chairman of the Council of People's Commissars of the Soviet Union – Vyacheslav Molotov

Births
 May 24 – Joseph Brodsky
 June 28 – Alina Vedmid, politician and agronomist.
 October 5 – Rein Aun, Estonian decathlete and coach (d. 1995)

Deaths
 January 27 – Isaac Babel
 February 2
 Vsevolod Meyerhold
 Robert Eikhe
 Mikhail Koltsov
 February 4
 Nikolai Yezhov
 Mikhail Frinovsky
 10 March – Mikhail Bulgakov

See also
 1940 in fine arts of the Soviet Union
 List of Soviet films of 1940

References

Further reading
 Bloch, Leon Bryce and Lamar Middleton, ed. The World Over in 1940 (1941) detailed coverage of world events online free; 914pp

 
1940s in the Soviet Union
Years in the Soviet Union
Soviet Union
Soviet Union
Soviet Union